Chériennes is a commune in the Pas-de-Calais department in the Hauts-de-France region of France.

Geography
Chériennes is a village situated some 20 miles (32 km) southeast of Montreuil-sur-Mer on the D134E3 road.

Population

See also
Communes of the Pas-de-Calais department

References

Communes of Pas-de-Calais
Artois